Cheikh Taylor (born December 12, 1973) is an American politician serving as a member of the Mississippi House of Representatives from the 38th district. Elected in 2016, he assumed office in 2017.

Background 
Taylor was born in Columbus, Mississippi and raised in Starkville, Mississippi. He earned a Bachelor of Science degree from Howard University. Taylor was elected to the Mississippi House of Representatives in November 2016 and assumed office in 2017. During his tenure in the House, Taylor has served as the vice chair of the County Affairs Committee.

References 

Living people
1973 births
People from Columbus, Mississippi
People from Starkville, Mississippi
Howard University alumni
Democratic Party members of the Mississippi House of Representatives